The following is a list of rocks and stones around the world.

References

 Individual rocks
Stones